The golden-fronted leafbird (Chloropsis aurifrons) is a species of leafbird. It is found from the Indian subcontinent and south-western China, to south-east Asia and Sumatra.

It builds its nest in a tree, laying 2-3 eggs. This species eats insects and berries.

Taxonomy and systematics 
Formerly, the Sumatran leafbird was considered as a subspecies, but the two differ extensively in morphology and other characteristics.

Description 
The adult is green-bodied with a black face and throat bordered with yellow. It has dark brown irises and blackish feet and bill. It has a yellowish orange forehead and blue moustachial line (but lacks the blue flight feathers and tail sides of blue-winged leafbird). Young birds have a plain green head and lack the black on their face and throat. The black of the face and throat appears slightly duller in females.

The southern Indian race,  C. a. frontalis, has a narrower yellow border to black face. The throat is black and it has a blue sub-moustachial stripe and duller orange forehead. Towards the extreme south of India and Sri Lanka the race insularis occurs which is slightly smaller than frontalis.

Vocalization 

Its song consists of rising and falling liquid chirps in bulbul-like tones and its call may include harsh whispers. They are also known to mimic the calls of other bird species and have loud calls.

Distribution and habitat 
The golden-fronted leafbird is a common resident breeder in India, Bangladesh, Sri Lanka, and parts of Southeast Asia. Its habitat is forest and scrub.

Behaviour and ecology 
The golden-fronted leafbird builds its nest in a tree, laying 2-3 eggs. This species eats insects and berries.

Gallery

References

Birds of India by Grimmett, Inskipp and Inskipp, 
 Wells, D. R. (2005). Chloropsis aurifrons (Golden-fronted Leafbird). pp. 265–266 in: del Hoyo, J., A. Elliott, & D. A. Christie. eds. (2005). Handbook of the Birds of the World. Vol. 10. Cuckoo-shrikes to Thrushes. Lynx Edicions, Barcelona.

golden-fronted leafbird
Birds of South Asia
Birds of Southeast Asia
golden-fronted leafbird